Destruction: Los Angeles is a 2017 disaster film directed by Tibor Takács.

Plot
A volcano erupts near the metropolis of Los Angeles, followed by a fatal explosion and a strong, sudden earthquake. Finally, a rain of fire pours on the city and complete chaos breaks out. Family man and journalist John Benson sees his professional opportunity: he intends to write about the events in as much detail as possible in order to make a breakthrough as a journalist. As a result, he's studying the increasing seismic activity around the city.

However, he is also keen to keep his wife, Cathy, and their two children, Derek and Brooke, safe, and more than once faces the conflict between excellent reporting and the protection and safety of his family.

Cast
Craig Sheffer as John Benson
Cynthia Watros as Cathy Benson
Romeo Miller as Marcus Taylor-Jones
Robert Giardina as Good Samaritan
Emmanuelle Vaugier as Margot Taylor
C. J. Valleroy as Derek Benson
Sydne Mikelle as Brooke Benson (as Sydney Mikelle)
Liberte Chan as Olivia Li
Omar Angulo as Army National Guardsman
Cosima Cabrera as Maria
Raymond Forchion as Fire Marshall
Roger Howarth as Dr. Paul Grant
Redaric Williams as Darnell
Master P as Jay Jones
Mykel Shannon Jenkins as Officer Helms
Morgan Obenreder as Jessie – Paranoid Guest
Rene Aranda as Police Officer (uncredited)

Reception
The film received a 21% rating on Rotten Tomatoes from fewer than 50 ratings.

German online film portal Filmdienst wrote of the film, "A thoroughly conventional disaster film with all the melodramatic and action-packed clichés of the genre. Also listless in the treatment of the subplot about the figure of the reporter between desire for sensation and responsibility."

German film magazine TV Spielfilm criticizes the film for what it perceived was an "unimaginative" story with "cheap" special effects, saying that it "triggers comedy rather than panic." Director Tibor Takács is mockingly called in the review a "trash specialist." The review ends saying, "L.A. is burning – unfortunately the film survived."

References

External links
 

2010s disaster films
2017 films
American disaster films
2010s English-language films
Films set in Los Angeles
Films about volcanoes
Films about earthquakes
Films directed by Tibor Takács
2010s American films